The 1972 Star World Championships were held at Puerto Azul in Naiguatá, Venezuela in 1972.

Results

References

Star World Championships
1972 in sailing
Sailing competitions in Venezuela